"To the Moon" (stylised all caps, also written "to the moon!" per its cover) is a song by Gambian-born England-based rapper Jnr Choi, released as a single on 5 November 2021 independently, and later through Epic and Black Butter Records. It is a drill track that samples British singer-songwriter Sam Tompkins's cover of Bruno Mars's "Talking to the Moon". It went viral on TikTok and was prominently playlisted by Spotify.

Background
Jnr Choi was born in Gambia and moved to London, where he pursued a career in modelling and also began rapping after a friend suggested the idea to him. He collaborated with the producer Parked Up in August 2021, who sent him a beat. Jnr Choi wrote the lyrics for it and "sent it back the next day completely finished".

Sam Tompkins is a singer-songwriter from Brighton who has had successful viral videos on TikTok. He released his debut EP Who Do You Pray To? in 2022.

Temporary removal from streaming platforms
"To the Moon" was temporarily removed from streaming platforms in January 2022 before being restored, which was considered to be in relation to the rights regarding its sample. After being re-added, Tompkins received a co-lead artist credit.

Remixes
Two remixes to the song were released. One remix featured American rapper Gunna and was released on 25 March 2022. The second remix was a drill remix featuring American rappers Fivio Foreign and G Herbo alongside British rappers Russ Millions and M24, which was released on 29 April 2022.

Charts

Weekly charts

Year-end charts

Certifications

Release history

References

2021 singles
2021 songs
Black Butter Records singles
Epic Records singles
Songs written by Ari Levine
Songs written by Bruno Mars
Songs written by Jeff Bhasker
Philip Lawrence